The 1987 Cal Poly Mustangs football team represented California Polytechnic State University during the 1987 NCAA Division II football season.

Cal Poly competed in the Western Football Conference (WFC). The Mustangs were led by first-year head coach Lyle Setencich and played home games at Mustang Stadium in San Luis Obispo, California. They finished the season with a record of seven wins and three losses (7–3, 3–3 WFC). Overall, the team outscored its opponents 275–173 for the season.

Schedule

Notes

References

Cal Poly
Cal Poly Mustangs football seasons
Cal Poly Mustangs football